Sin Kek Tong (died 27 February 2017) was a Singaporean politician. Originally a member of the opposition Singapore Democratic Party (SDP), Sin left the SDP in 1994 with a breakaway faction of SDP members who supported SDP founder Chiam See Tong in an internal conflict against Chee Soon Juan and other SDP leaders. Sin and Chiam's supporters then started the Singapore People's Party (SPP), with Sin standing in as secretary-general until Chiam officially joined the SPP in 1996. Throughout his political career, Sin had contested in six general elections from 1988 to 2011, but had never won any of them.

Political career

Singapore Democratic Party 
Sin made his political debut in the 1988 general election when he contested as a candidate of the opposition Singapore Democratic Party (SDP) in Braddell Heights SMC against Goh Choon Kang, a candidate from the governing People's Action Party. He lost garnering 41.2% of the vote against Goh's 58.8%.

Sin contested in Braddell Heights SMC again during the 1991 general election under the SDP banner, but lost to Goh again, garnering 47.73% of the vote against Goh's 52.27%.

Singapore People's Party 
In 1994, Sin left the SDP with a breakaway faction of SDP members who had supported SDP founder Chiam See Tong during his falling-out with the SDP's central executive committee led by Ling How Doong and Chee Soon Juan. After that, he set up the Singapore People's Party (SPP) on 21 November 1994 and served as its secretary-general. In December 1996, Chiam left the SDP and joined the SPP, taking over the role of secretary-general from Sin, who became the party's chairman.

During the 1997 general election, Sin contested in Ayer Rajah SMC as a SPP candidate against the PAP candidate Tan Cheng Bock. He lost after garnering 26.83% of the vote against Tan's 73.17%.

Singapore Democratic Alliance 
In 2001, the SPP joined forces with three other opposition parties (NSP, PKMS and SJP) to form the Singapore Democratic Alliance (SDA). During the general election that year, Sin contested as part of a five-member SDA team in Jalan Besar GRC against a five-member PAP team. The SDA team lost after garnering 25.51% of the vote against the PAP team's 74.49%.

Sin contested in the 2006 general election as a SDA candidate in MacPherson SMC against PAP candidate Matthias Yao, but lost with 31.52% of the vote against Yao's 68.48%.

2011 general election 
After the SPP withdrew from the SDA in 2011, Sin contested in the general election that year as a SPP candidate in Hong Kah North SMC against PAP candidate Amy Khor. He lost after garnering 29.39% of the vote against Khor's 70.61%.

In 2012, Sin stepped down from his position as chairman of the SPP to facilitate party renewal and because of health issues.

Death 
Sin died from prostate cancer on 27 February 2017 at the age of 72, leaving behind his wife, daughter, two sons and three grandchildren.

References

2017 deaths
Singapore People's Party politicians
Political party founders
Singaporean politicians of Chinese descent
1944 births